Lance Oppenheim (born January 26, 1996) is an American filmmaker, documentarian, and producer from Fort Lauderdale, Florida.  His work blends cinematic genres to explore the lives of people who create homes in unconventional spaces and places. His debut feature Some Kind of Heaven (2020) was an Official Selection at the 2020 Sundance Film Festival.

Life
Oppenheim was born in Fort Lauderdale, Florida, the son of attorneys Roy and Ellen Oppenheim, and raised in Southwest Ranches, Florida. Oppenheim  attended Pine Crest School from 2010 to 2014. He graduated from Harvard University in 2019 with a degree in Visual and Environmental Studies. While at Harvard, Oppenheim studied under filmmakers Ross McElwee, Robb Moss, and Guy Maddin and lived in Adams House.

Career
In high-school, Oppenheim directed several short documentaries, one of which was distributed nationwide by PBS. He would send documentary pitches to the New York Times Op-Docs' open submission portal, documenting “crazy things happening in [his] backyard," which the New York Times would "politely reject."

He broke through to the New York Times while studying at Harvard's undergraduate Visual and Environmental Studies program. While in college, Oppenheim directed three short documentaries that were acquired and distributed by The New York Times Op-Docs. His short The Happiest Guy in the World about long-term cruise passenger Mario Salcedo premiered at the Tribeca Film Festival in 2018.

Oppenheim directed and produced his debut feature Some Kind of Heaven, a documentary exploring life inside The Villages, Florida, as part of his undergraduate senior thesis. Specifically, Oppenheim follows four seniors living in The Villages and how they cope with later adult life. The film was produced by filmmaker Darren Aronofsky and The New York Times, one of the paper's first feature-length productions. The film premiered a year later at the 2020 Sundance Film Festival and International Film Festival Rotterdam to critical acclaim,  and was later acquired by Magnolia Pictures.

Filmography
The Dogmatic (2012)
Quicksand (2013)
The Off Season (2014)
Long Term Parking (2016)
No Jail Time: The Movie (2017)
The Happiest Guy in the World (2018)
Some Kind of Heaven (2020)
The Paradise Next Door (2021)

References

External links
 

American documentary filmmakers
Film directors from Florida
Living people
Harvard University alumni
English-language film directors
1996 births
Pine Crest School alumni